Eric Powell may refer to:
 Eric Powell (comics) (born 1975), American comic book artist and writer
 Eric Powell (American football) (born 1979), American football defensive end
 Eric Powell, American musician for the band 16Volt
 Eric Powell (rower) (1886–1933), British rower
 Eric Powell (politician) (born 1966), American politician from Mississippi